Enrique Rodríguez Negrón (born July 14, 1933 in Toa Alta, Puerto Rico) served as a member of the Senate of Puerto Rico from 1989 to 2001.  From 1993 to 2001, he chaired the Senate Tourism Committee and partnered with then Executive Director of the Puerto Rico Tourism Company Luis Fortuño in advancing the tourism and economic legislative agenda of the administration of Governor Pedro Rosselló. During Senate Judiciary Committee hearings regarding the 1978 Cerro Maravilla events, Rodríguez Negrón was an outspoken defender of former Governor Carlos Romero Barceló.

Prior to his legislative service, Rodríguez Negrón served as a Superior Court judge, as President of the Puerto Rico Industrial Development Company, as well as State Director for the federal Farmers Home Administration, one of a few Puerto Ricans to have served in prominent positions in all three branches of government, as well as in the Federal government.

Enrique Rodríguez Negrón was an attorney, judge developer and a Korean War era United States Air Force veteran. He died on November 24, 2022 in Green Cove Springs, Florida at age 89. He was buried at the Jacksonville National Cemetery.

References

1933 births
2022 deaths
Members of the Senate of Puerto Rico
Puerto Rican lawyers
People from Toa Alta, Puerto Rico
Puerto Rican judges
United States Air Force airmen